Miroslav Krleža (7 July 1893 – 29 December 1981) was a Yugoslav and Croatian writer who is widely considered to be the greatest Croatian writer of the 20th century. He wrote notable works in all the literary genres, including poetry (Ballads of Petrica Kerempuh, 1936), theater (Messrs. Glembay, 1929), short stories (Croatian God Mars, 1922), novels (The Return of Philip Latinowicz, 1932; On the Edge of Reason, 1938), and an intimate diary. His works often include themes of bourgeois hypocrisy and conformism in Austria-Hungary and the Kingdom of Yugoslavia. Krleža wrote numerous essays on problems of art, history, politics, literature, philosophy, and military strategy, and was known as one of the great polemicists of the century. His style combines visionary poetic language and sarcasm.

Krleža dominated the cultural life of Croatia and Yugoslavia for half a century. A "Communist of his own making", he was severely criticized in Communist circles in the 1930s for his refusal to submit to the tenets of socialist realism. After the Second World War, he held various cultural posts in Socialist Yugoslavia, and was most notably the editor of the Yugoslav Lexicographical Institute and a constant advisor on cultural affairs to President Tito. After the break with Stalin, it was his speech at the 1952 Congress of Yugoslav Writers that signaled a new era of comparative freedom in Yugoslav literature.

Biography
Miroslav Krleža was born in Zagreb. He enrolled in a preparatory military school in Pécs, modern-day Hungary. At that time, Pécs and Zagreb were within the Austro-Hungarian Empire. Subsequently, he attended the Ludoviceum military academy at Budapest. He defected to Serbia but was dismissed as a suspected spy. Upon his return to Croatia, he was demoted in the Austro-Hungarian army and sent as a common soldier to the Eastern front in World War I. In the post-World War I period Krleža established himself both as a major Modernist writer and politically controversial figure in Yugoslavia, a newly created country which encompassed South Slavic lands of the former Habsburg Empire and the kingdoms of Serbia and Montenegro.

Krleža was the driving force behind leftist literary and political reviews Plamen (The Flame) (1919), Književna republika (Literary Republic)  (1923–1927), Danas (Today) (1934) and Pečat (Seal) (1939–1940). He became a member of the Communist Party of Yugoslavia in 1918, but was expelled in 1939 because of his unorthodox views on art, his opposition to Socialist realism, and his unwillingness to give open support to the Great Purge, after the long polemic now known as "the Conflict on the Literary Left", pursued by Krleža with virtually every important writer in the Kingdom of Yugoslavia, in the period between the two World Wars. The Party commissar sent to mediate between Krleža and other leftist and party journals was Josip Broz Tito.

After the establishment of the Nazi puppet Independent State of Croatia under Ante Pavelić, Krleža refused to join the Partisans headed by Tito. Following a brief period of social stigmatization after 1945 – during which he nevertheless became a very influential vice-president of the Yugoslav Academy of Science and Arts in Zagreb, while Croatia's principal state publishing house, Nakladni zavod Hrvatske, published his collected works – Krleža was eventually rehabilitated. Supported by Tito, in 1950 Krleža founded the Yugoslav Institute for Lexicography, holding the position as its head until his death. The institute would be posthumously named after him, and is now called the Miroslav Krleža Institute of Lexicography.

From 1950 on, Krleža led a life as a high-profile writer and intellectual, often closely connected to Tito.  He also briefly held the post of president of the Yugoslav writers' union between 1958 and 1961. In 1962 he received the NIN Award for the novel Zastave, and in 1968 the Herder Prize.

Following the deaths of Tito in May 1980, and Bela Krleža in April 1981, Krleža spent most of his last years of his life in ill health. He was awarded the Laureate Of The International Botev Prize in 1981. He died in his Villa Gvozd in Zagreb, on 29 December 1981 and was given a state funeral in Zagreb on 4 January 1982. In 1986, Villa Gvozd was donated to the City of Zagreb. It was opened to the public in 2001, but is temporarily closed due to the 2020 Zagreb earthquake damage as of 2021.

Works

Krleža's formative influences include Scandinavian drama, French symbolism and Austrian and German expressionism and modernism, with key authors like Ibsen, Strindberg, Nietzsche, Karl Kraus, Rilke, and Proust.

Krleža's opus can be divided into the following categories:

Poetry
Although Krleža's lyric poetry is held in high regard, by common critical consensus his greatest poetic work is Balade Petrice Kerempuha (Ballads of Petrica Kerempuh), spanning more than five centuries and centred on the figure of plebeian prophet "Petrica Kerempuh", a Croatian Till Eulenspiegel.

Novels
Krleža's novelistic oeuvre consists of four works: Povratak Filipa Latinovicza (The Return of Philip Latinowicz), Na rubu pameti (On the Edge of Reason), Banket u Blitvi (The Banquet in Blitva) and Zastave (The Banners). The first one is a novel about an artist. On the Edge of Reason and The Banquet in Blitva are satires (the latter located in an imaginary Baltic country and called a political poem), saturated with the atmosphere of all-pervasive totalitarianism, while The Banners has been dubbed a "Croatian War and Peace". It is a multi-volume panoramic view of Croatian (and Central European) society before, during, and after World War I, revolving around the prototypical theme of fathers and sons in conflict. All Krleža's novels except Zastave (The Banners), have been translated into English.

Short stories and novellas
The most notable collection of Krleža's short stories is the anti-war book Hrvatski bog Mars (Croatian God Mars), on the fates of Croatian soldiers sent to the slaughterhouse of World War I battlefields.

Plays
Krleža's main artistic interest was centered on drama. He began with experimental expressionist plays like Adam i Eva and Michelangelo Buonarroti, dealing with defining passions of heroic figures, but eventually opted for more conventional naturalist plays. The best known is Gospoda Glembajevi (The Glembays), a cycle dealing with the decay of a bourgeois family. Golgota is another play, political in nature.

Diaries and memoirs
Krleža's memoirs and diaries include Davni dani (Olden days) and Djetinjstvo u Agramu (Childhood in Zagreb). Other works include Dnevnici (Diaries) and the posthumously published Zapisi iz Tržiča (Notes from Tržič) chronicle multifarious impressions.

Selected works

Hrvatski bog Mars (1922)
Gospoda Glembajevi (1928)
Povratak Filipa Latinovicza (1932)
Balade Petrice Kerempuha (1936)
Na rubu pameti (1938)
Banket u Blitvi (1939)
Zastave (1962)

Translations into English:

Krleža, Miroslav. The Banquet in Blitva (Banket u Blitvi, 1939). Translated by Edward Dennis Goy and Jasna Levinger-Goy. Evanston, IL: Northwestern University Press, 2004.

_. The Cricket Beneath the Waterfall, and Other Stories (Cvrčak pod vodopadom). Various translators; edited by Branko Lenski. New York: Vanguard Press, 1972.

_. Harbors Rich in Ships: Selected Revolutionary Writings (The Glembays, 1928, and other early texts). Translated by Željko Cipriš. New York: Monthly Review Press, 2017.

_. Journey to Russia (Izlet u Rusiju, 1925). Translated by Will Firth. Zagreb: Sandorf, 2017.

_. On the Edge of Reason (Na rubu pameti, 1938). Translated by Zora Depolo. New York: New Directions, 1995.

_. The Return of Philip Latinowitz (Povratak Filipa Latinovicza, 1932). Translated by Zora Depolo. Evanston, IL: Northwestern University Press, 1995.

References

Sources
Enes Čengić; S Krležom iz dana u dan, Globus, 1986, Zagreb
 Viktor Žmegač: Krležini europski obzori, 1984, Zagreb
 "Krležijana": Enciklopedija Miroslava Krleže, LZMK, 1993, Zagreb
 Stanko Lasić: Krležologija, I-VI, 1987.-1993, Globus, Zagreb

External links 

Introduction to Author  
 
Miroslav Krleža in South Slavic Literature Library
KRLEŽA, Miroslav 

1893 births
1981 deaths
Writers from Zagreb
People from the Kingdom of Croatia-Slavonia
Croatian dramatists and playwrights
Croatian essayists
Male essayists
Croatian novelists
Male novelists
Croatian male poets
Yugoslav writers
20th-century male writers
Croatian communists
Communist writers
Vladimir Nazor Award winners
Struga Poetry Evenings Golden Wreath laureates
Members of the Croatian Academy of Sciences and Arts
Modernist writers
Burials at Mirogoj Cemetery
20th-century Croatian people
20th-century Croatian poets
20th-century novelists
20th-century dramatists and playwrights
20th-century essayists
Herder Prize recipients
Recipients of the Order of the Hero of Socialist Labour